Happisburgh is a village civil parish in the English county of Norfolk. The village is on the coast, to the east of a north–south road, the B1159 from Bacton on the coast to Stalham. It is a nucleated village.  The nearest substantial town is North Walsham  to the west.

The place-name 'Happisburgh' is first attested in the Domesday Book of 1086, where it appears as Hapesburc. The name means 'Hæp's fort or fortified place'.

Happisburgh became a site of national archaeological importance in 2010 when flint tools over 800,000 years old were unearthed. This is the oldest evidence of human occupation anywhere in the UK. In May 2013, a series of early human footprints were discovered on the beach at the site, providing direct evidence of early human activity at the site.

Land in the area has been lost to the sea for thousands of years. The rate of erosion is the same as it has been for the past 5,000 years. In 1968, groynes were constructed along the shore to try to slow the erosion. In the 2001 census, before the separation of Walcott parish to the north-west, the parish (which also includes the settlements of Happisburgh Common and Whimpwell Green) had a population of 1,372 in 607 households. For the purposes of local government, the parish is in the district of North Norfolk.

Governance
Happisburgh electoral ward includes the parishes of Happisburgh, Lessingham, East Ruston, Ingham, Honing and Brunstead. The ward boundaries were altered for the 2019 elections. The previous ward had a population of 2,386 in 1,085 households.

Local features

St Mary's Church

In 1086 the incoming Norman aristocracy had a simple church built on the site of the current tall stone one. It was demolished and rebuilt in the 15th century. The tall tower of St Mary's church is an important landmark to mariners as it warns of the position of the treacherous nearby sandbanks. A new staircase was added to the top of the tower in 2001, in memory of the Happisburgh schoolboy Thomas Marshall, who was murdered in nearby Eccles on Sea in 1997. There is also a plaque to his memory; he is buried in the churchyard.

In 1940 a German bomber released a trapped bomb from its bays during its return to Germany, and some shrapnel from the bomb can still be seen embedded in the aisle pillars of the church. The church's octagonal font, also of the 15th century, is carved with figures of lions and satyrs.

Lighthouse

The red-and-white striped lighthouse,  to the south of the church is the only independently operated lighthouse in Great Britain and is the oldest working lighthouse in East Anglia having been constructed in 1790. It is open to the public on occasional Sundays during the summer.

Lifeboat station

In 1866 the first lifeboat house was built, by the Royal National Lifeboat Institution (RNLI), on the cliffs above Old Cart Gap at a cost of £189. Its building here was prompted by its proximity to the treacherous Haisborough Sands. It closed in 1926 and the lifeboat was withdrawn.

A small boathouse was built in a similar site in 1965 to house a D-class inshore lifeboat that went into service in June of that year. In 1987 the boathouse was replaced by a new, more modern building with better facilities for crews. This was further extended in 1998. A new D-class lifeboat, Colin Martin, was placed on service on 13 September 1994.

In December 2002 the lifeboat launching ramp was washed away due to massive erosion. A temporary station was opened within three months at Old Cart Gap. The original station is now used for training and souvenir sales.

On 22 October 2003 a new D-class lifeboat D-607 Spirit of Berkhamsted was placed on service. The station has been honoured with an RNLI Silver Medal, awarded in 1886 to Coxswain John Cannon in acknowledgment of his long and valuable service.

Happisburgh Manor or St Mary's
The main land use is a private garden to the homes here, forming an ornate 19th-century estate on the site of fields until the middle of that century.  The estate is central and towards the coast from the kinked village street.  The main house which was thatched from local reeds was worked up by Detmar Blow from an initial detailed design by Ernest Gimson with whom Blow had collaborated at Stoneywell. Blow was responsible for practical architectural changes to the initial design and overall architectural management of the build during the period 1900–1902 with his 'leading man' Frank Green from East Knowle supervising on the spot. It is pretty certain that Gimson supplied the interior timber fittings and in particular the complicated timber roof structure. It is mainly a grade II listed (starting category) listed park and garden, having been designed as an Arts and Crafts movement garden by Detmar Blow to accompany the butterfly-plan summer home for wealthy landowner Albemarle Cator, seated at Woodbastwick Hall, Woodbastwick, who decided to build homes or gatehouses for his family.  The north end of the largest, his home, was destroyed by a bomb, and was restored by Christobel Tabor (née Cator) after the war. The Cators sold the site in 1969, at which time the three houses of St John's, St Anne's and St Mary's came into separate ownership. The restored main home is Grade II* listed, which is the middle category.

Coastal erosion

Land has been lost to the sea at Happisburgh for thousands of years. More recently, the names Whimpwell Street and Whimpwell Green in Happisburgh are all that remains of the ancient Happisburgh parish of Whimpwell, lost to the sea only by 1183. As an even more recent example, in 1845, a 12-acre plot of Happisburgh disappeared in a single night. Sea defences were built in 1959 to slow the erosion. Changes in government policy mean that coastal protection in Happisburgh is no longer fundable from central government. Beach Road that leads into the sea is being constantly eroded, and the houses nearest the sea were demolished in 2012 as a part of a coast management scheme. Initiatives in the town to adapt to climate change and sea level rise have included a government-funded relocation scheme for owners of threatened homes.

Archaeology
In 2010, Simon Parfitt and colleagues from University College London discovered flint tools near Happisburgh. The tools were dated to "somewhere between 866,000 to 814,000 years ago or 970,000 to 936,000 years ago", around 100,000 years earlier than the finds at Pakefield. The flints were probably left by hunter-gatherers of the human species Homo antecessor who inhabited the flood plains and marshlands that bordered an ancient course of the river Thames. The flints were then washed downriver and came to rest at the Happisburgh site. 

In May 2013 the Happisburgh footprints, the oldest human footprints found outside of Africa, being more than 800,000 years old, were reported to have been discovered on the beach.

Folklore
There is a local legend dating from the 16th century that Happisburgh is haunted by the ghost of a murdered smuggler. The ghost was reported as having no legs, and its head hanging behind its back by a thin strip of flesh. The legend says that the smuggler's mutilated body was found in a well.

Notable residents
Charles William Peach, naturalist and geologist
Richard Porson, classical scholar

See also
 Genetic history of the British Isles
 List of human evolution fossils
 List of prehistoric structures in Great Britain
 Prehistoric Britain
 List of irregularly spelled places in England
Local offshore sandbanks dangerous to shipping:
Hammond's Knoll
Haisborough Sands

Gallery

References

External links

Information from Genuki Norfolk on Happisburgh.
Village website
Happisburgh from the Literary Norfolk website
A case study of coastal erosion at Happisburgh by the British Geological Survey
The earliest humans outside Africa by the British Museum's Nicholas Ashton

North Norfolk
Villages in Norfolk
Populated coastal places in Norfolk
Civil parishes in Norfolk
Stone Age sites in England
Paleoanthropological sites
Beaches of Norfolk